Sophie Paris Vietnam  is the Vietnamese arm of the French-owned, direct-selling fashion company. With its head office in Jakarta, Indonesia, Sophie Paris provides fashion accessories and beauty products in Indonesia, Morocco, Philippines, Malaysia, and Vietnam. The company employs more than 550 staffs a year. It has more than 100,069 active members around the world.

Company 
Sophie Paris Vietnam was launched in November 2010 by Nick Johnson, General Director of Sophie Paris Vietnam, and has its office at 84B Tran Quoc Toan, Ward 8, District 3. Ho Chi Minh City. The catalogs are released every 45 days and feature French designed products. The company opened with 45 staffs and currently employs more than 80. The number of members increased to more than 20,000 in the first year with sales of more than US$4,5 million.

In May 2012, the company expanded by opening a rep office in Danang and a few months later a branch in Hanoi.

Sophie Paris Vietnam is a 100% foreign direct investment company and it is certified and recognized by the Direct Selling Committee of the American Chamber of Commerce in Vietnam where Nick Johnson served as the Vice Chairman during his time with Sophie Paris.

Currently, activities in Sophie Paris Vietnam have been halted.

Products 
 Bags
 Wallets
 Watches
 Cosmetics
 Sunglasses
 Belts
 Accessories

References

External links 
 cataloguesophie.com
 Túi xách
 sophieparis.vn
 amchamvietnam.com
 thesaigontimes.vn

Clothing brands